Bilal Mustapha Shafayat (born 10 July 1984) is an English former first-class cricketer. He played as a middle-order batsman,  bowler and wicket-keeper. Shafayat was a former captain of the England under-19 side.

He was educated at the Nottingham Bluecoat School, but left after he found a place in cricket.

He started his career at Nottinghamshire but moved to Northamptonshire in 2005. One early highlight of his career was a catch made for England as a substitute fielder in a Test against New Zealand in 2004. He returned to Nottinghamshire for the 2007 season.

He was the twelfth man in the 2009 Cardiff Test against Australia. He was the focus of a controversy when he came out twice during the final overs of the match as the last pair of England batsmen were trying to save the match. The Australian captain accused the England team of time-wasting.

He was released by Nottinghamshire after the 2010 season. He played domestic First Class cricket in Pakistan in 2010/2011.
He played second eleven cricket for Hampshire at the start of 2011 and averaged 239.5 in his two matches before returning to Northamptonshire on a match-by-match basis during the 2011 season, playing for the Second XI and the first team in Twenty20 and List A matches during June and July 2011. He ended the season playing for Wellington in the Birmingham league. In April 2012 he joined Shropshire.
In May 2012 he was registered by Hampshire and went on to sign for them for 2013 season.

References

English cricketers
Nottinghamshire cricketers
Northamptonshire cricketers
1984 births
Living people
English people of Pakistani descent
Cricketers from Nottingham
National Bank of Pakistan cricketers
Pakistan Customs cricketers
Nottinghamshire Cricket Board cricketers
Habib Bank Limited cricketers
Shropshire cricketers
Hampshire cricketers
Matabeleland Tuskers cricketers
British Asian cricketers
People educated at Nottingham Bluecoat Academy
British sportspeople of Pakistani descent
Lincolnshire cricketers